William Edward Dudek is a retired American football coach.  He served as the head coach at Graceland University in Lamoni, Iowa from 1974 to 1992.

Head coaching record

References

1943 births
Living people
American football tackles
Graceland Yellowjackets football coaches
Graceland Yellowjackets football players
People from Belle Plaine, Iowa